Man Like Mobeen is a British comedy-drama television series set in Small Heath, Birmingham. It is produced by Cave Bear and Tiger Aspect Productions for digital channel BBC Three and is written by Guz Khan and Andy Milligan.

Plot
Man Like Mobeen follows the life of the titular Mobeen as he spends time with his friends Nate and Eight and, in the absence of parents, raises his much younger sister, Aqsa, in Small Heath, Birmingham. Mobeen tries to live a good life as a Muslim and ensure his sister reaches her potential while escaping his murky past as a drug dealer.

Cast and characters

Main 
 Guz Khan as Mobeen Deen: A reformed former drug dealer raising his younger sister and trying to improve his community.
 Tolu Ogunmefun as Nate: Mobeen's best friend and advocate.
 Tez Ilyas as Arslan "Eight" Mughal: Mobeen and Nate's close friend, part of the chosen family to Aqsa.
 Dúaa Karim as Aqsa: Mobeen's younger sister, often exasperated with him but loves and looks up to him.
 Perry Fitzpatrick as Officer Harper: The strict but ultimately fair police officer who helps and is helped by Mobeen.
 Art Malik as Uncle Khan: The leader of one of the biggest gangs in Small Heath who forces Mobeen to work for him after his best friend Cal steals a car with £30,000 worth of cocaine belonging to him, while threatening his family and Aqsa.

Recurring 
 Mark Silcox as Uncle Shady: a sadistic and outspoken figure in the local community, but close ally to Mobeen and co.
 Kiell Smith-Bynoe as Jovell Maynard: A drug dealer
 Aimee-Ffion Edwards as Miss Aitken: Aqsa's English teacher
 Perry Fitzpatrick as Officer Harper: The strict but ultimately fair police officer who helps and is helped by Mobeen.

Background and production
While working as a humanities teacher in a secondary school in Coventry, Guz Khan began making YouTube videos in character as Mobeen, an opinionated care worker who is raising his sister Aqsa. One video reacted to Fox News's suggestion that Birmingham was a no-go area for non-Muslims while another went viral after calling for a boycott of Jurassic World due to its use of the word "Paki" to refer to the dinosaur, Pakisaurus, a herbivore from the Cretaceous period found in current day Baluchistan, as it sounds like the racial slur for people of Pakistani descent, "Paki". Steve Coogan's production company Baby Cow picked up on Khan's YouTube videos and made a pilot for BBC Three's new talent show, Comedy Feeds. Khan has described the pilot as "very generic, super-sitcomy" and stated that he wanted to make "something more substantial" with Man Like Mobeen. The four part first series, produced by Cave Bear and Tiger Aspect Productions, was announced by BBC Three controller Damian Kavanagh at the 2017 Edinburgh Festival and was released on iPlayer in December of the same year.

The show was picked up for a second series of four episodes in September 2018. During filming for the second series' first episode, which deals with knife crime, Khan and other members of the production called an ambulance after seeing a young boy attacked and threatened with a knife. Khan has stated that while waiting for the ambulance he felt that "nothing was more real than the very subject we were filming and talking about". In response to the success of the programme with younger audiences, the BBC announced in March 2019 that a third series of Man Like Mobeen had been commissioned, which aired in 2020. In September 2020, a fourth series was confirmed.

Scripts for Man Like Mobeen were written by Khan and Andy Milligan, creator of the comedy drama Undercover and script writer for TV presenters Ant & Dec. Khan has stated that he wanted the show to portray "the funny yet complex realities of life for young working class men and women in Britain today", alongside an authentic account of Birmingham, which he feels "gets almost no positive representation in the media".

Episodes

Pilot (2016)

Series One (2017)

Series Two (2019)

Series Three (2020)

Critical reception
Writing for the Financial Times, Harriet Fitch Little described the first series as "an exceptionally funny character comedy that spins jokes with a subtlety that’s rare for such a young writer". Before the release of the third series in January 2020, the NMEs Gary Ryan said that Man Like Mobeen "isn't just one of the funniest sitcoms of recent times – it may also be one of the most important" and described the show as "Only Fools and Horses meets Breaking Bad – a lightning-in-a-bottle sitcom that features flawed-but-loveable characters you enjoy hanging out with, while actually saying something about the world they inhabit".

References

Bibliography

External links

 
 

2017 British television series debuts
2010s British comedy-drama television series
2020s British comedy-drama television series
BBC comedy-drama television shows
English-language television shows
Asian-British culture
BBC television sitcoms
British Pakistani mass media
Islam in fiction
Islamic comedy and humor
Pakistani diaspora in the United Kingdom
Television series by Endemol
Television series by Tiger Aspect Productions
Television shows set in Birmingham, West Midlands